Tomás 'Mossy' Quinn is an Irish Gaelic footballer from Dublin who plays for the St Vincents club and, formerly, for the Dublin county team.

Biography
Sometimes known as Mossy Quinn, he attended Ardscoil Rís in Marino.

He made his debut for Dublin in the opening match of the 2003 National Football League against Armagh. Quinn was part of the Dublin panel that won the All-Ireland Senior Football championship in 2011. On 2 November 2012, Quinn retired as an inter-county player.

He was the free-taker for the senior Dublin team. He has finished the last two seasons in the league as the top scorer for his county and finished as top scorer in the 2005 championship. Quinn had been coached by former Dublin player and club-mate Jimmy Keaveney.

After retiring from the inter-county game, Quinn was an integral part of the St Vincent's team that won Dublin and Leinster SFC in 2013 and then the All-Ireland Club title versus Castlebar Mitchells on St Patrick's Day at Croke Park. St Vincent's retained their Dublin and Leinster SFC crowns in 2014 but were beaten by eventual winners Corofin in the All-Ireland semi-final in Feb 2015. Quinn again played a key role in St Vincent's winning the Dublin SFC, with a man of the match performance in the 2016 final against Castleknock. He collected his fourth Leinster club title after defeating Offaly champions Rhode but Vincent's were beaten by Derry champions Slaughtneil in the All-Ireland final in Feb 2017.

In January 2014, Quinn took up his role as Commercial and Marketing Manager for Dublin GAA, the first role of its kind for GAA counties.

National League appearances

Championship appearances

Yearly performance

2005
In the 2005 league Quinn became Dublin's first choice free taker. Throughout the National Football League he showed he could hold his nerve scoring the winning points in two matches from dead balls. He finished the NFL campaign with 4–23 (0-13f, 1–0 pen, 0–2 '45').

Quinn was on the Dublin panel that beat Laois in the Leinster Senior Football Championship Final at Croke Park. He scored a total of four points in the final with two being of special note both scored in the dying minutes. The first drew the teams level while the second was the match winning point.

He finished the 2005 All-Ireland and Leinster Championships with a total of 1–29, which confirmed him as the top scoring player from Leinster. He finished in fifth top scorer as the All-Ireland Championship due to a lack of progress on Dublin's part in the 2005 Championship.

2006
He finished the 2006 NFL campaign as top scorer for the Dublin Senior panel with a total score of 3–22 (2–0 pens, 0-13f, 0–4 '45'). He was on Dublin's winning side in the 2006 Leinster Senior football championship final clash against Offaly, helping Dublin gain their 46th championship. Quinn featured in the All-Ireland quarter-final victory over Westmeath, notching a first-half goal. He was substituted in the second half of the All-Ireland semi-final defeat to Mayo.

At club level, Mossy scored a total of 1–4 (0–3 '45', 0-1f) for St Vincent's in their drubbing of Parnells, taking St Vincent's to the fourth round of the 2006 Dublin Senior Football Championship. In the fourth round, St Vincent's met St Brigid's. Quinn's first half goal proved to be the difference between the sides in a game that finished with a scoreline of 1–8 to 0–9. Mossy scored a total of 1–2 in the game which took St Vincent's in the Dublin Senior Club Football Championship quarter-final, where they played St Judes. His form continued against St Judes in a tight game in which Mossy scored 2–2 to take his side into the Dublin Championship semi-final against Na Fianna. Quinn helped guide his team past Na Fianna and went on to lose against UCD in the final. He finished the Dublin Championship as top-scorer in this year's championship with 7–31 (eight games). Quinn was named on the 2006 Dublin Bus/Evening Herald Blue Star football XV at full forward.

2007
He won the 2007 O'Byrne Cup for Dublin against Laois at O'Connor Park in Offaly. The game finished on a scoreline of 1–18 to 2–13 against Laois. Mossy scored 1–11 (0-4f, 0–2 '45') for Dublin during their 2007 campaign in Division 1A. Mark Vaughan replaced Quinn as the freekick taker for the Dublin senior football team for Dublin's second game against Meath in the quarter-final of the Leinster Senior Football Championship. Vaughan scored 0-8 as the freetaker and was selected as the freetaker for the semi-final against Offaly. Quinn  retained his position on the Dublin team, despite losing his role as freetaker. Quinn won his first Dublin Senior Football Championship medal with St Vincent's in 2007, scoring 0–4 in the final against St Brigid's at Parnell Park. Mossy then went on to win the Leinster Senior Club Football Championship final against Tyrrellspass of Westmeath.

2008
Tomás won the 2008 All-Ireland Senior Club Football Championship with St Vincent's as captain while scoring total of 0–7 (0-5f) in their final win over Nemo Rangers. Quinn was restored his free e-taking role with the Dublin senior team. He won his fourth Leinster title in a row with Dublin against Wexford in the final at Croke Park.

References

Year of birth missing (living people)
Living people
DCU Gaelic footballers
Dublin inter-county Gaelic footballers
Gaelic football forwards
St Vincents (Dublin) Gaelic footballers